Tanya Maniktala (born 7 July 1997) is an Indian actress who mainly works in Hindi web shows. She is best known for her portrayal of Ishita in Flames (2018) and Lata Mehra in A Suitable Boy (2020).

Early life
Maniktala was born on 7 July 1997 in Delhi. She completed her graduation from Shivaji College, University of Delhi. She also worked as a copywriter during her early career days.

Career 
Maniktala made her acting debut in 2018 with School Days. The same year, Timeliner's Flames opposite Ritvik Sahore, became her first success and she received praises for her performance.

In 2020, she portrayed Lata Mehra in BBC One's A Suitable Boy alongside Ishaan Khattar, which proved as a major turning point in her career. She received praises from the critics for her performance.

In 2021, she appeared in Netflix's Feels Like Ishq opposite Skand Thakur and in Sony LIV's Chutzpah alongside Varun Sharma. She also appeared in Netflix's How To Fall In Love opposite Ayush Mehra.

Maniktala will make her Hindi film debut with Mumbaikar alongside Vijay Sethupathi and Vikrant Massey. She also has Pratim D Gupta's Untitled next opposite Shantanu Maheshwari along with web series P.I. Meena and Flames Season 3 in her kitty.

Filmography

Films

Web series

Awards and nominations

References

External links 
 

1997 births
Living people
Delhi University alumni
21st-century Indian actresses
Year of birth uncertain
Place of birth missing (living people)
Indian copywriters
Indian television actresses